2015 Varsity Rugby was the 2015 edition of four rugby union competitions annually played between several university teams in South Africa. It was contested from January to April 2015 and was the eighth edition of these competitions.

Rules

All four 2015 Varsity Rugby competitions used a different scoring system to the regular system. Tries were worth five points as usual, but conversions were worth three points, while penalties and drop goals were only worth two points.

All Varsity Cup games also had two referees officiating each game, props' jerseys featured a special gripping patch to ensure better binding, intended to reduce collapsing scrums and the mark was extended to the entire field.

Varsity Cup

There was no relegation at the end of 2015.

Varsity Shield

There was no promotion at the end of 2015.

Young Guns

Competition Rules

There were eight participating universities in the 2015 Young Guns competition. These teams were divided into two pools and each team played every team in the other pool once over the course of the season, either home or away.

Teams received four points for a win and two points for a draw. Bonus points were awarded to teams that scored four or more tries in a game, as well as to teams that lost a match by seven points or less. Teams were ranked by log points, then points difference (points scored less points conceded).

The top two teams overall qualified for the title play-off final.

Teams

Standings

The final league standings for the 2015 Varsity Cup Young Guns were:

Fixtures and results

The 2015 Varsity Cup Young Guns fixtures were as follows:

 All times are South African (GMT+2).

Round one

Round two

Round three

Round four

Round five

Round six

Final

Koshuis Rugby Championship

Competition Rules

There were eight participating teams in the 2015 Koshuis Rugby Championship competition, the winners of the internal leagues of each of the eight Varsity Cup teams. These teams were divided into two pools and each team played every team in the other pool once over the course of the season, either home or away.

Teams received four points for a win and two points for a draw. Bonus points were awarded to teams that scored four or more tries in a game, as well as to teams that lost a match by seven points or less. Teams were ranked by log points, then points difference (points scored less points conceded).

The top two teams overall qualified for the title play-off final.

Teams

Standings

The final league standings for the 2015 Koshuis Rugby Championship were:

Fixtures and results

The 2015 Koshuis Rugby Championship fixtures were as follows:

 All times are South African (GMT+2).

Round one

Round two

Round three

Round four

Round five

Round six

Final

See also

 Varsity Cup
 2015 Currie Cup Premier Division
 2015 Currie Cup qualification
 2015 Currie Cup First Division
 2015 Vodacom Cup
 2015 Varsity Cup
 2015 Varsity Shield
 2015 SARU Community Cup
 2015 Under-21 Provincial Championship Group A
 2015 Under-21 Provincial Championship Group B
 2015 Under-19 Provincial Championship Group A
 2015 Under-19 Provincial Championship Group B

References

External links
 

2015
2015 in South African rugby union
2015 rugby union tournaments for clubs